Styphelia viridis, commonly called green five corners, is a plant in the family Ericaceae and is endemic to the east coast of Australia. It owes its common name to the appearance of its fruit - a drupe with a flat top and five distinct ribs, and to the colour of its flowers. The flowers appear in autumn and winter and are a source of food for honeyeaters.

In describing this species, Henry Cranke Andrews noted: "Few of the plants from New Holland have excited more admiration than the Styphelias....our present plant, together with the other species already known from dried specimens, lead us to conjecture that the genus is as copious as any, Banksias not excepted, from that country."

Description

The branchlets are stiff and covered with very fine, white hairs.

The flowers are a translucent bottle-green. Flowering occurs from April to August and is followed by the fruit which is a flat-topped, five-sided greenish-red drupe.

Taxonomy and naming
Styphelia viridis was first described in 1803 by Henry Cranke Andrews in The Botanist's Repository for New, and Rare Plants. The specific epithet (viridis) is a Latin word meaning "green" referring to the colour of the flowers.

There are two subspecies recognised:
 Styphelia viridis Andrews subsp. viridis occurs between Seal Rocks and Botany Bay in New South Wales and is distinguished by having shorter anthers as well as other minor differences;
 Styphelia viridis subsp. breviflora (Benth.) J.M.Powell occurs from Red Rock north to southern Queensland and is distinguished from the other subspecies by having somewhat longer anthers.

Distribution and habitat
Styphelia viridis occurs on the coast and ranges of New South Wales and southern Queensland growing in heath and dry sclerophyll forest on sandy soils.

Uses

Horticulture
This species is not well known in cultivation. It can be grown from seed or cuttings. It requires a semi-shaded position, well drained soil and adequate watering.

References

viridis
Ericales of Australia
Flora of New South Wales
Flora of Queensland
Plants described in 1803
Taxa named by Henry Cranke Andrews